This is a sortable discography of French Canadian pianist and composer Marc-André Hamelin. He records exclusively for the Hyperion label, although he has recorded for other labels in the past. In addition to the works of commonly heard composers, he has recorded a great deal of non-standard repertoire, such as music of Charles-Valentin Alkan, Leopold Godowsky, Georgy Catoire, Sophie Carmen Eckhardt-Gramatté, as well as his own compositions.

Audio recordings

Video recordings

References
Arkiv Music, primary discographical source
Discography from Official Website
An internet discography
Frazer Jarvis's discography

Discographies of Canadian artists
Discographies of classical pianists